Ernest Hanley Protheroe, born 1866, was a teacher and prolific author of fiction and non-fiction.

Biography
Protheroe was a teacher and became a prolific author, sometimes writing under various pen names.  during the First World War he wrote some patriotic biographies including Lord Kitchener and Edith Cavell.

He was known to have lived in Wimbledon and Hyde, Greater Manchester.

Protheroe died in 1929.

Personal life
Protheroe and his wife Alice had three sons, Alan, Cyril and Geoffrey, and two daughters, Marjorie and Phyllis.

Bibliography
A selection of Prothroe's work includes:

References

Sources and further reading
 

1866 births
1929 deaths
20th-century British male writers
20th-century British non-fiction writers
British male non-fiction writers
20th-century British novelists
British male novelists